The International Conference on Software Engineering and Formal Methods (SEFM) is an international academic conference in the field of software engineering.

History 
Until 2002, SEFM was a workshop; it then became a full international conference. It is sponsored by the IEEE Computer Society. The 1st IEEE International Conferences on         Software Engineering and Formal Methods  (SEFM 2003) was  held at Brisbane, Australia in September 2003. Submissions originated from 22 different countries. As well as IEEE-CS, supporters for SEFM 2003 included the  Australian Computer Society (ACS), Boeing Australia, and the Italian Embassy in Canberra.

The proceedings for the conference are published by the Springer Science+Business Media in LNCS since 2011. Previously, the proceedings were published by IEEE.

Aims
SEFM aims to bring together practitioners and researchers from academia, industry, and government, to advance the state of the art in formal methods, to help in their large-scale application in the software industry, and to encourage their integration with other practical software engineering methods.

The conferences are often held in the Asia and Pacific regions and specifically in developing countries. An important aim of the SEFM conferences is to encourage research cooperation between developing countries and industrialized countries. SEFM 2010 was in Pisa, Italy. SEFM 2013 was in Madrid, Spain. SEFM 2014 takes place in Grenoble, France 

The SEFM conference series is included on the DBLP online publications database. Revised selected papers sometimes appear as special journal issues.

References

External links 
 SEFM website

Recurring events established in 2003
Software engineering conferences
Formal methods
IEEE conferences
September events